The North Carolina judicial elections of 2000 were held on 7 November 2000, to elect judges to the North Carolina Supreme Court and North Carolina Court of Appeals.

Supreme Court

Chief Justice

Freeman seat

Court of Appeals

Horton seat

John seat

Lewis seat

Martin seat

Wynn seat

Footnotes

Judicial
2000